Lotto is a station on Lines 1 and 5 of the Milan Metro in Milan, Italy. The underground station was opened on 1 November 1964 as the northwestern terminus of the inaugural section of the Metro, between Sesto Marelli and Lotto. On 8 November 1975, the line was extended by one station to QT8. Since 2015, it has also been served by Line 5. It is located on Piazzale Lorenzo Lotto.

References

Line 1 (Milan Metro) stations
Line 5 (Milan Metro) stations
Railway stations opened in 1964